Animatricks is annual animation festival taking place in Helsinki every April. The organization behind the festival (Palikka ry) was formed in 1999 and the first Animatricks festival took place in 2000. Animatricks is the only film festival in Finland, that concentrates purely on animation. The festival program consists yearly of Finnish as well as international compilations of films and screenings put together to fit the festivals ever changing themes. The Animatricks festival also includes a yearly competition where the best international animation is awarded with 3000 euros.

Winners of the Finnish short animation competition 
 Laura Neuvonen: Kutoja, 2005
 Anna Virtanen: Lauantai vuonna, 2005
 Ami Lindholm: Ilo irti, 2006
 Kim Helminen: Säieteoria, 2007
 Leena Jääskeläinen: Vaihdokas, 2009
 Kaisa Penttilä: Munaralli, 2010
 Jari Vaara: Syntymäpäivä, 2011
 Heta Jokinen: Sivussa, 2013
 Kari Pieskä: Viis Varpaista, 2014
 Pietari Bagge, Christer Hongisto, Elisa Ikonen ja Inka Matilainen: Valvoja, 2015

Winners of the international short animation competition 
 Tomek Ducki : Baths (Łaźnia), 2014
 Matt Reynold: Bottomfeeders, 2015
 Cerise Lopez and Agnès Patron: Chuylen - a crow's tale, 2016

References

Animation film festivals
Short film festivals
Arts festivals in Finland
Animation-related lists
Student film festivals
Film festivals in Finland
Festivals in Helsinki
Spring (season) events in Finland